John Finnemore's Double Acts is a series of radio comedy programmes, written by John Finnemore. It is an anthology series of largely unconnected two-handers.

The first series of six episodes was broadcast on Radio 4 in October and November 2015. A second series of six episodes was broadcast in May, June and July 2017. The series' working title was The John Finnemore Project.

The programme was produced and directed by David Tyler.

Format
Each episode features only two main speaking parts, apart from Finnemore himself who acts as announcer. Additional, uncredited, voices are sometimes heard briefly. Each episode is a self-contained play, though four in the first series are loosely connected by incidental details, mainly revolving around references to a fictional bath supplier called Willard & Son: "A Flock of Tigers", which is set in the 1930s, features the character Edmund Willard - the father of the titular "son" - while "Wysinnwyg", "Hot Desk" and "Red-Handed" all involve characters who work for the company in the present day. Both "Red Handed" (which takes place over half an hour in real time) and "Hot Desk" (which takes place over a few weeks) are implied to take place within the time frame of "Wysinnwyg" (which covers several months), and contain callbacks to each other in the form of references to characters appearing in the others. John Finnemore's Souvenir Programme has also featured a sketch in which Yvonne, a character mentioned but not directly appearing in "The Rebel Alliance", gives her wedding toast.

Awards

The episode "A Flock of Tigers" was shortlisted for Best Scripted Comedy Drama in the BBC Audio Drama Awards 2016. The episode "English for Pony Lovers" won the Writers Guild of Great Britain Award for Best Comedy in January 2017. "Penguin Diplomacy" received a commendation for Best Audio Drama Script at the 2018 BBC Audio Drama Awards.

Episode list

Series one

Series two
The fifth episode, Here's What We Do, was originally intended to be the third episode, but was pushed back two weeks 'due to circumstances beyond anyone's control'. As a result, The Rebel Alliance and Penguin Diplomacy were each pushed forward one week. The episodes appear in the original order on the CD and Audible release.

References

External links

BBC Radio 4 programmes
BBC Radio comedy programmes
BBC Radio dramas
Two-handers
2017 radio programme debuts